Prosentoria is a genus of stick insects in the tribe Clitumnini, erected by Carl Brunner von Wattenwyl in 1907.  Species have been recorded from: Vietnam and Borneo (distribution is probably incomplete).

Species
The Phasmida Species File lists:
 Prosentoria arrogans Brunner von Wattenwyl, 1907 - type species
 Prosentoria vietnamensis Ho, 2020

References

External links

Phasmatodea genera
Phasmatodea of Asia
Phasmatidae